In-Q-Tel (IQT), formerly Peleus and In-Q-It, is an American not-for-profit venture capital firm based in Arlington, Virginia. It invests in high-tech companies to keep the Central Intelligence Agency, and other intelligence agencies, equipped with the latest in information technology in support of United States intelligence capability. The name "In-Q-Tel" is an intentional reference to Q, the fictional inventor who supplies technology to James Bond. 

In-Q-Tel has stated that the average dollar invested by In-Q-Tel in 2016 attracts fifteen dollars from other investors.

History
Originally named Peleus and known as In-Q-It, In-Q-Tel was founded by Norm Augustine, a former CEO of Lockheed Martin, and by Gilman Louie, who was In-Q-Tel's first CEO.  In-Q-Tel's mission is to identify and invest in companies developing cutting-edge technologies that serve United States national security interests. According to the Washington post, In-Q-Tel started as the idea of then CIA director George Tenet. Congress approved funding for In-Q-Tel, which was increased in later years. Origins of the corporation can also be traced to Ruth A. David, who headed the Central Intelligence Agency Directorate of Science & Technology in the 1990s and promoted the importance of rapidly advancing information technology for the CIA. In-Q-Tel now engages with entrepreneurs, growth companies, researchers, and venture capitalists to deliver technologies that provide superior capabilities for the CIA, DIA, NGA, and the wider intelligence community. In-Q-Tel concentrates on three broad commercial technology areas: software, infrastructure and materials sciences.

Former CIA director George Tenet says,

We [the CIA] decided to use our limited dollars to leverage technology developed elsewhere.  In 1999 we chartered ... In-Q-Tel. ... While we pay the bills, In-Q-Tel is independent of CIA. CIA identifies pressing problems, and In-Q-Tel provides the technology to address them. The In-Q-Tel alliance has put the Agency back at the leading edge of technology ... This ... collaboration ... enabled CIA to take advantage of the technology that Las Vegas uses to identify corrupt card players and apply it to link analysis for terrorists [cf. the parallel data-mining effort by the SOCOM-DIA operation Able Danger], and to adapt the technology that online booksellers use and convert it to scour millions of pages of documents looking for unexpected results.

In-Q-Tel sold 5,636 shares of Google, worth over US$2.2 million, on November 15, 2005. The shares were a result of Google's acquisition of Keyhole, Inc, the CIA-funded satellite mapping software now known as Google Earth.

In August 2006, In-Q-Tel had reviewed more than 5,800 business plans and invested approximately $150M in more than 90 companies. In 2016, it was funded with at least $120M per year primarily from the CIA, as well as the NSA, FBI, and US Defense Department.

As of 2016, In-Q-Tel listed 325 investments, but more than 100 were kept secret, according to the Washington Post. The absence of disclosure can be due to national-security concerns or simply because a startup company doesn’t want its financial ties to intelligence publicized.

Governance
In-Q-Tel is a Virginia-registered corporation, legally independent of the CIA or any other government agency. The corporation is bound by its Charter agreement and annual contract with the CIA, which set out the relationship between the two organizations. In-Q-Tel's mission to support the Intelligence Community's technical needs is promoted by the In-Q-Tel Interface Center (QIC), an office within the CIA that facilitates communication and relationships between In-Q-Tel and government intelligence organizations. While In-Q-Tel is a nonprofit corporation, it differs from IARPA and other models in that its employees and trustees can profit from its investment. A Wall Street Journal investigation found that in 2016, nearly half of In-Q-Tel's trustees had a financial connection with a company the corporation had funded. 

In-Q-Tel's current president and CEO is Christopher A. R. Darby. The chairman of the board is Michael M. Crow.

Investments

The company lists the majority of its investments on its website page.

In-Q-Tel functions partially in public; however, what products it has and how they are used is strictly secret. According to The Washington Post, "virtually any U.S. entrepreneur, inventor or research scientist working on ways to analyze data has probably received a phone call from In-Q-Tel or at least been Googled by its staff of technology-watchers."

Software

 MemSQL – Distributed, in-memory, SQL database management system for real-time analytics
 Keyhole, Inc – Geospatial visualization application (Acquired by Google in 2004 and would go on to become Google Earth in 2005)
 Boundless Spatial – geospatial software
 Huddle – cloud-based content collaboration software
 Oculis Labs – visual cyber security solutions
 Destineer – games FPS training simulation
 GeoIQ FortiusOne – visualization on maps
 Forterra – virtual worlds for training
 Quantum4D – visualization technology
 Visual Sciences – real-time visual analysis
 Spotfire – visualisation data analytics
 Algorithmic — Infrastructure for deploying and scaling AI/ML models
 Palantir Technologies – data integration, search and discovery, knowledge management, and secure collaboration
 PiXlogic – visual search
 Agent Logic – event detection and response software – Webspector webpage change software
 ArcSight – secure software
 Zaplet – email
 Authentica – secure messaging and secure document sharing
 Teradici Corporation – desktop virtualization
 Connectify – Wifi & VPN
 SafeWeb PrivacyMatrix – browsing (closed in Nov. 2001)
 Visible Technologies – social media monitoring
 Silver Tail Systems – website fraud prevention
 InnoCentive – crowdsourcing websites
 Fetch Technologies – Internet Data Management -bots & RSS
 SRA OrionMagic – cms software
 Recorded Future – web intelligence and predictive analytics
 Traction Software – web 2.0
 Internet Evidence Finder – Digital forensic tool
 Basis Technology – multilingual text analytics and cyber forensics
 Language Weaver – automatic language translation
 Lingotek – translation services
 Cassatt – desktop software
 Tacit Knowledge Systems – internal software
 FMS – analysis, visualization, and knowledgebase to the Federal Intelligence Community
 Initiate Systems – real-time multiple database software
 TerraGo – location intelligence applications and software GeoPDF
 Geosemble – unstructured data analytics and geospatial software
 NovoDynamics – Arabic character recognition
 Adapx – Microsoft Office & GIS
 Digital Reasoning – Synthesys v3.0 – review facts and associations at a glance
 CallMiner – phone speech analytics software
 Carnegie Speech – speech recognition
 AzTE] PRISM – handwriting recognition
 A4Vision – 3D facial imaging
 SRD – identity resolution software
 Inktomi Corp – network infrastructure software
 Mohomine mohoClassifier – organises mass data
 Stratify – organizes mass data
 Endeca – search data repositories
 Inxight – search engine
 Convera RetrievalWare – search engine
 MetaCarta – search engine
 Attensity – search engine
 Platfora – big data analytics and visualization
 Intelliseek – search engine
 FireEye – malware protection
 ReversingLabs – malware detection and analysis
 zSpace (company) – 3-Dimensional holographic imaging displays
 Socrata – Open Data Solutions for Government Innovation
 Interset – Security Analytics/User Behavior Analytics
 Nozomi Networks – OT and IoT security and visibility
 D2iQ (formerly Mesosphere) – Apache Mesos and Kubernetes consulting firm
 Fuel3D – 3D scanning 
 TRX Systems – 3D mapping
 Wickr - Encrypted messaging application

Material science
Biotech

 Biomatrica – biolab tech anhydrobiosis storage
 SpectraFluidics – detection of trace airborne chemicals
 Arcxis Biotechnologies – sample processing and pathogen detection
 febit group – DNA
 Boreal Genomics – DNA fingerprints
 T2 Biosystems – medical diagnostic devices, miniaturized magnetic resonance (MR)
 OpGen – microbial genome analysis
 Infobionics – biotech cellular database
 Microchip Biotechnologies – analysis instrumentation for biodefense
 Cambrios Technologies – biomaterials for solid-state electronic devices
 Seahawk Biosystems – diagnosis biosensor products
 Sionex – chemical and biological sensors
 Polychromix – material analysis and chemical sensing
 IatroQuest – detect biological and chemical agents
 IntegenX – NanoBioProcessor & molecular diagnostics
 Seventh Sense Biosystems – health monitoring and medical diagnostics
 Sonitus Medical – transmits sound via the teeth
 MedShape – orthopedic devices from shape memory materials

Electricity
 Electro Energy – nickel-metal hydride batteries for satellites & aircraft
 Qynergy Corporation – long-lived batteries, Micro-Electro-Mechanical Systems
 Infinite Power Solutions – micro-batteries
 Skybuilt Power – solar, wind, fuel cells, batteries, fossil fuels, telecommunications – Mobile Power Station(MPS) 3.5kW to 150kW
 Semprius – solar energy
 AdaptivEnergy – miniature piezo generators
 Power Assure – managing power consumption
 MiserWare – reduces energy

Electronics
 Nanosys – nanotech components
 Alfalight – high-power lasers & torches
 IDELIX Software – pliable display technology
 Perceptive Pixel – multi-touch displays
 WiSpry – radio components
 Nextreme Thermal Solutions – circuit-board thermoelectric components
 Digital Solid State Propulsion – electronic controls for solid rocket motors
 Infinite Z – virtual-holographic monitors
 Voxel8 – 3D printed electronics

Video
 3VR Security – DVR archiving
 MotionDSP – digital video
 Pixim – video cameras
 COPAN – data storage
 iMove – immersive video
 Pelican Imaging – better camera phones
 LensVector – optical autofocus
 InView Technology Corporation – cameras and hyper-spectral imagers
 Rhevision – tunable camera lens
 Signal Innovations Group – signal, image, and video analytics
 Elemental Technologies – video processing
 KZO Innovations – streaming video software
 VSee – video conferencing

Infrastructure
Hardware
 Xanadu Quantum Technologies – photonic quantum computers
 Tyfone – digital security for mobility, cloud, and IoT
 Genia Photonics – fiber-optics products
 Advanced Photonix, Inc. – fiber optics
 SitScape – Command & Control room hardware
 SpotterRF – micro surveillance radar
 QD Vision – monitors, displays and lighting
 GATR Technologies – inflatable satellite dishes
 CoreStreet – door access control systems
 Redlen Technologies – CZT x-ray & gamma ray detectors
 Etherstack – radios
 Paratek microwave – smart scanning antennas
 D-Wave Systems – quantum computers
 Pragmatic Semiconductor – flexible electronics

Sensor networks
 ThingMagic – RFID
 Dust Networks – low-power wireless mesh networking systems
 Ember Corporation – ZigBee – wireless semiconductor
 Gainspan – low power Wi-Fi
 Tendril Networks – software for wireless sensor and control networks
 TenXsys – telemetry systems for remote monitoring, NASA
 StreamBase – real-time data in government/military, RFID/sensor networks
 Thetus – software for remote sensing instruments
 Soflinx defender – a Wireless Sensor Network for fences
 PlateScan – automatic license plate recognition (ALPR) sensor network

Data centers
 Bay Microsystems – packet processing and data traffic
 Cleversafe – data storage clouds and massive digital archives
 Cloudera – data storage and analysis
 Asankya – Hypermesh data streams
 CopperEye – data retention
 Systems Research and Development – real-time data warehousing
 Network Appliance – Decru (networked data storage)

Security testing
 Network Chemistry – RFprotect, WiFi security
 Veracode – application security testing

Related personnel
Numerous noteworthy business and intelligence community professionals have been involved with In-Q-Tel at various times, including the following:
 Dan Geer (2008–present) Chief Information Security Officer
 Michael D. Griffin – former president; later administrator of NASA.
 Norman R. Augustine
 Gilman Louie – former CEO
 Paul G. Kaminski – former director
 Amit Yoran – former CEO
 John Seely Brown
 Stephen Friedman
 William J. Perry
 Alex J. Mandl
 Rebecca Bace
 Luciana Borio
 Peter Barris
 Anita K. Jones
 Jami Miscik
 Jeong H. Kim

References

External links
 Official website
 White Paper on the In-Q-Tel concept from the CIA's website
 In-Q-Tel  from Federal Computer Week
 In-Q-Tel  from govexec.com
 The Report of the Independent Panel on the CIA In-Q-Tel Venture from Business Executives for National Security (bens.org)
 Press releases
 Lerner, Josh, G. Felda Hardymon, Kevin Book, and Ann Leamon. "In-Q-Tel." Harvard Business School Case 804-146, February 2004. (Revised May 2005.)
 Venture Funds and Other Advanced Technologies for National Intelligence Services (September 5, 2012).

Central Intelligence Agency
Venture capital firms of the United States
Mass surveillance
Privately held companies based in Virginia
Financial services companies established in 1999
1999 establishments in Virginia